A Man's World is a 1918 American silent drama film, directed by Herbert Blaché. It stars Emily Stevens, John Merkyl, and Frederick Truesdell, and was released on June 24, 1918.

Cast list
 Emily Stevens as Frankie Ware
 John Merkyl as David Powell (*aka Wilmuth Merkyl)
 Frederick Truesdell as Malcolm Gaskell
 Florence Short as Lione Brune
 Baby Ivy Ward as Kiddie
 Walter Hiers as Larry Hanlon
 Sidney Bracy as Emile Grimeaux
 Vera Royer as Clara Oakes
 Lucile Dorrington as Alice Ellery
 Vinney Binns as Slavey

References

External links 
 
 
 

American films based on plays
Metro Pictures films
Films directed by Herbert Blaché
American silent feature films
American black-and-white films
Silent American drama films
1918 drama films
1918 films
1910s English-language films
1910s American films